The German River is the principal tributary of the North Fork of the Shenandoah River, flowing for  in the U.S. state of Virginia. The river originates in northern Rockingham County, just east of the West Virginia border, in the George Washington National Forest, near the crest of Shenandoah Mountain in the Allegheny Mountains.

Course
Tributaries of the German River (ordered from upstream to downstream) are Camp Rader Run, Beech Lick Run, Sumac Run, Paint Lick Run, the Cold Spring River, Persimmon Run, and Siever Run. Near Bergton, the German River joins Crab Run to form the North Fork of the Shenandoah River.

Tributaries
Beech Lick Run
Sumac Run
Cold Spring River
Persimmon Run
Siever Run

See also
List of rivers of Virginia

References

External links
 Google Map - German River

Rivers of Virginia
Tributaries of the Shenandoah River
Rivers of Rockingham County, Virginia